Minerve  was a French airline, headquartered in the 1st arrondissement of Paris, that operated from 1975 until it merged with AOM to form AOM French Airlines in 1992.

History

Minerve began operations in 1975 using Sud Aviation Caravelle aircraft on charter flights from Paris-Le Bourget airport.  Permission was granted for charter flights to the United States in 1983 and those were operated first with Douglas DC-8 jets and later on with a Boeing 747-200 wide body jetliner.

For charter flights to the Mediterranean and North Africa the Caravelles were used until replaced in 1987 by McDonnell Douglas MD-83. Minerve wanted to expand into North America and created a subsidiary in Canada called Minerve Canada, but that venture did not last long and it had a negative effect on the parent company.  Other investments in Jet Alsace and Jet Fret created more financial burdens which led to the sale of 50% of the stock to the tour operator Club Méditerranée.  To expand operations, three McDonnell Douglas DC-10-30 wide body jetliners were acquired for long-range services.

In 1991 Minerve was operating scheduled passenger services between Paris and Bangkok, Guadeloupe, Martinique, Nice, San Francisco and Tahiti with DC-10-30 jets being primarily operated on the international routes. The same year, the airline published a joint timetable with French air carrier Air Liberte.

In 1992 Minerve merged with Air Outre Mer to form AOM French Airlines.

Fleet details

5 – Sud SE-210 Caravelle
3 – Douglas DC-8-53
3 – Douglas DC-8-61
1 – Douglas DC-8-62
2 – Douglas DC-8-73
1 – Boeing 747-200
3 – McDonnell Douglas DC-10-30
4 – McDonnell Douglas MD-83

References

External links

Fleet and code information

			 

 

Defunct airlines of France
Airlines established in 1975
Airlines disestablished in 1992